Silao Leaegailesolo, shortened as Leaega (born 24 June 1973, in Apia) is a former Samoan rugby union player and now coach. He played as a wing.

Career
He first started to play for Samoa during a match against Tonga, at Apia, on 28 June 1997. He was part of the 1999 Rugby World Cup roster, where he played 2 matches and made 62 points, scoring 2 tries, 10 penalty kicks and 11 conversion kicks. With the Manu Samoa, he made 19 caps and 160 points, scoring 3 tries, 31 penalty kicks and 26 penalty kicks. His last cap for Samoa was against South Africa, at Pretoria, on 6 July 2002.
In New Zealand, he played for North Harbour at the NPC.
After the 1999 Rugby World Cup, Leaega moved to Italy, playing for Rugby Bologna 1928 (with which he won the promotion to the top division). Then he played for Rugby Reggio  and then, he moved for Parma. Between 2004 and 2006, he played for Rugby Rovigo, while later he played for Petrarca.

Later, he spent a season playing for Riviera, to then return to Reggio Rugby in the 2010–11 season, during which the team conquered the A2 championship and the right to play the play-offs for the promotion to Eccelenza against Calvisano.

He had the role as player and coach for Lupi di Canolo, rugby team of the town of Correggio in the Serie C regional championship for 5 seasons, to then return to Parma as coach.

References

External links

Silao Leaega at New Zealand Rugby History

Rugby union coaches
Samoan rugby union players
Samoan expatriate rugby union players
Samoa international rugby union players
Samoan expatriate sportspeople in Italy
Samoan expatriate sportspeople in New Zealand
Expatriate rugby union players in Italy
Expatriate rugby union players in New Zealand
Sportspeople from Apia
Rugby union wings
1973 births
Living people